The Ghost Walks is a 1934 American horror film directed by Frank R. Strayer starring John Miljan and June Collyer.

Plot
On a stormy night, a theatrical producer, his secretary, and playwright Prescott Ames are stranded when their car skids off the road and gets stuck. The three take refuge in the nearby home of Dr. Kent, a friend of Ames's. One of Kent's patients, who is staying at the house, is acting strangely, and the others in the house tell the newcomers that she is behaving this way because it is the anniversary of her husband's murder. At dinner, the group begins exchanging accusations about the murder, when suddenly the lights go out, and soon afterwards comes the first in a series of mysterious and fearful events.

The producer thinks all the strange occurrences are part of a ploy to get him to produce a play for Ames: One of the other characters exclaims, "These fools think we are putting on a play for their benefit!" The dinner-party was a scene from Ames's play, but when a madman sneaks into the house and tries to graft different body parts on the theatrical producer and his secretary, they realize it isn't a play.

Cast
John Miljan as Prescott Ames
June Collyer as Gloria Shaw
Richard Carle as Herman Wood
Henry Kolker as Dr. Kent
Johnny Arthur as Homer Erskine
Spencer Charters as a Guard
Donald Kirke as Terry Shaw aka Terry Gray
Eve Southern as Beatrice
Douglas Gerrard as Carroway (billed as Douglas Gerard)
Wilson Benge as Jarvis
Jack Shutta as Head Guard
Harry Strang as Guard

See also
List of ghost films

External links

1934 films
American black-and-white films
American mystery thriller films
Films directed by Frank R. Strayer
Chesterfield Pictures films
1934 horror films
American horror thriller films
1930s mystery thriller films
1930s English-language films
1930s American films